Nathaniel Langford Clapton (1 September 1903 – January 1967), the only son of Nathaniel Clapton, ironmonger's manager, of St Dunstan's Crescent, Worcester.

He attended the Royal Grammar School Worcester, before gaining a scholarship to Hertford College, Oxford, where he gained first class honours in Mathematical Moderations in 1923 and in the Final Honour School of Mathematics in 1925.

He was successively Senior Mathematics Master at Watford Grammar School for Boys and The Glasgow Academy. He became Headmaster of Boteler Grammar School, Warrington, in September 1940, and was appointed Headmaster of King Edward VII School, Sheffield, in 1950.

He retired on health grounds in July 1965 and died in January 1967.

References

 Cornwell, John (2005). King Ted's (1st ed.). King Edward VII School, Sheffield. .
 MacBeth, George (1987). A Child of the War (1st ed.). Jonathan Cape Ltd. .
 Various (1995). Tha'll never gerr in theer... (1st ed.). King Edward VII School, Sheffield. .

External links
Old Edwardians' site

1903 births
1967 deaths
People from Worcester, England
People educated at the Royal Grammar School Worcester
Alumni of Hertford College, Oxford
Heads of schools in England